The Power of the Daleks is the completely missing third serial of the fourth season of British science fiction television series Doctor Who, and which was first broadcast in six weekly parts from 5 November to 10 December 1966. It is the first full story to feature Patrick Troughton as the Second Doctor.

In this serial, the new Doctor (Troughton) and his travelling companions Polly (Anneke Wills) and Ben (Michael Craze) land on the planet Vulcan. There they find an Earth colony, where the lead scientist Lesterson (Robert James) discovers a 200-year-old alien capsule containing three inactive Daleks. Once brought back to life, the Daleks act as the colony's servants, but all they really want is power. Although audio recordings, still photographs, and clips of the story exist, no episodes of this serial are known to have survived.

This is the sixth incomplete Doctor Who serial released with full-length animated reconstructions of its six missing episodes. All six episodes were released on the BBC Store from 5 November–10 December 2016 in weekly order, 50 years after the serial's original broadcast dates.

Plot
After his transformation from an elderly man into a younger man, the Doctor seemingly ignores or deliberately misunderstands direct questions from his companions Ben and Polly, and refers to his previous self as another person. His companions are at first unsure how to treat him: Ben suspects he is an imposter, but Polly is willing to believe he is the same man. The TARDIS lands on the planet Vulcan, where the Doctor witnesses the murder of an examiner from Earth, sent to inspect the planet's colony (why the examiner was summoned is a mystery). The Doctor, using the dead man's badge, pretends to be the examiner. A security team, led by Bragen, escorts the Doctor, Ben and Polly to the colony, where they meet the governor, Hensell, and his deputy Quinn. There are indications of a rebel faction that Hensell does not take seriously.

The Doctor and his companions learn of a two-century-old capsule discovered by the colony's scientist, Lesterson. The Doctor sneaks into the laboratory, with Ben and Polly following, where they discover two Daleks inside the capsule, with a third missing. The group is discovered by Lesterson; the Doctor asks him where the third Dalek is, and the scientist reports that he hid what he assumed was a machine, with the intention to reactivate it. Later, Lesterson and his assistants manage to revive the Dalek and Lesterson removes its gun stick after one of the assistants, Resno, is killed.

Quinn, revealed as the one who summoned the examiner, is accused by Bragen of sabotage and is arrested, with his position then assigned to Bragen. The Doctor, Ben and Polly are present during these events, during which Lesterson arrives with the reactivated Dalek, which feigns loyalty. The Doctor remains suspicious and verbally hostile to the Dalek, who recognizes the Doctor, finally convincing Ben to accept that he is the Doctor. Lesterson reactivates the other two Daleks and removes their guns. The three Daleks are revealed to be secretly planning to take over the colony.

The Doctor's warning that the Daleks are secretly reproducing is ignored, and he and Ben are arrested by Bragen, who knows the Doctor is not the examiner: Bragen is the examiner's killer. Polly is kidnapped by the rebels. Bragen, secretly the leader of the rebels, executes his Coup d'état. He has a rearmed Dalek kill Hensell, and then decides to kill off the rebels.

Meanwhile, Lesterson loses his sanity upon discovering that the Daleks are being mass-produced inside the capsule. The Doctor, Quinn, and then Ben and Polly escape imprisonment and help fight what appears to be a losing battle. During the battle, Lesterson is killed by the Daleks. The Doctor finally destroys the Daleks by turning their own power source against them. Bragen is shot by one of the surviving rebels as he attempts to kill Quinn, who becomes the new governor. As the Doctor returns to the TARDIS with his companions, a damaged Dalek stands motionless, before its eyestalk moves as the TARDIS dematerializes.

Production

 Episode is missing

Working titles for this story included The Destiny of Doctor Who and Servants of Masters. Anneke Wills was on holiday and therefore absent from episode four. Similarly, Michael Craze was absent for episode five.

The Doctor's regeneration was meant to be a "horrifying" metaphysical change. The producers compared it to the hallucinogenic drug LSD, which had the side-effect of "hell and dank horror".

Episode 6 was recorded using the 625-line system before the official switchover, although it was telerecorded onto 35mm film, instead of videotape.

Cast notes
Bernard Archard returned in Pyramids of Mars (1975). Peter Bathurst returned in The Claws of Axos (1971). Robert James returned in The Masque of Mandragora (1976). Edward Kelsey had appeared in The Romans (1965) and would return in The Creature from the Pit (1979).

Missing episodes
The master tapes of episodes 1 through 5 were erased in the late 1960s, while the BBC Enterprise copies on 16mm for foreign sales were destroyed in 1974. The 35mm film negative of episode 6 was junked before 1970. Some clips survive from various other programmes, mainly focusing upon the Daleks in episodes 4, 5, and 6. A narrated trailer that aired the evening before the story was first broadcast contains 19 seconds worth of footage from episode 1, focusing on when the Doctor, Ben, and Polly find the two seemingly inactive Daleks in the capsule. In addition some footage filmed off-air by an Australian fan onto 8mm cine film exists, showing brief moments of the new Doctor's first moves in the TARDIS and other brief moments in the colony throughout episodes 1 and 2. Episode 3 has no surviving clips whatsoever.

Australian copies of the story were returned and junked in June 1975. Only two other countries purchased the story due to the restriction on Dalek sales by Terry Nation: the New Zealand Broadcasting Corporation in 1968, which then sent its copy to Radio Television Singapore in 1972. RTS's successor Mediacorp say they do not possess any copies, and what happened to this set is unknown, although it was probably destroyed.

Animated version

In August 2016, two minutes of animated footage from the serial appeared on YouTube. The professional nature of the animation, combined with the fact that the BBC had it removed within 48 hours, led to speculation that it had been leaked footage from a planned official release. The Daily Mirror then ran a story stating that a full animated reconstruction of the serial had been commissioned by the BBC. In September the BBC confirmed that it was producing a full animated version of The Power of the Daleks for release in November to coincide with the 50th anniversary of the serial's original broadcast. Two additional teasers were released the following month. 
The animation was directed by Charles Norton, with lead character art by Martin Geraghty, character shading by Adrian Salmon, props by Mike Collins, and background art by Daryl Joyce. Late into production, BBC America began work on a colourised version of the black and white animation.

The animation was released daily on the BBC Store in black and white between 5 and 10 November 2016, followed by a colour release of the complete serial on 31 December 2016. In North America, the animation was screened theatrically by Fathom Events on 14 November 2016 and aired on BBC America from 19 November 2016. For the 2020 re-release, the animation was re-composited and some sections were re-animated.

Reception 
In 1994, Science Fiction Chronicles Don D'Ammassa reviewed the novelisation as "competently done and entertaining."

In a poll undertaken by Doctor Who Magazine at the time of the show's 50th anniversary the story was rated the 19th best story of all time.

Commercial releases

In print

John Peel's novelisation was published by Virgin Books in July 1993. Although still published under the Target Books banner, this was the first novelisation to be published under the new format introduced by Virgin for the Virgin New Adventures/Virgin Missing Adventures series. The most notable difference is the increased page count.

The script of this serial, edited by John McElroy, was published by Titan Books in March 1993.

Home media
The audio soundtrack, recorded directly from television speakers by Graham Strong, survives. The BBC has given it three commercial releases: first, on cassette release with narration by Tom Baker; second, on CD with narration by Anneke Wills; and third, on MP3-CD for the 'Doctor Who: Reconstructed' range, again narrated by Wills. This release also includes a bonus slideshow for PC/Apple Mac users, merging the soundtrack with tele-snaps. The Wills-narrated soundtrack was also released in a collector's tin called Doctor Who: Daleks, along with the soundtrack to The Evil of the Daleks and a bonus disc featuring My Life as a Dalek, a story presented by Mark Gatiss and discussing the history of the Daleks.

In 2004, all known surviving clips were released on the DVD set Lost in Time. Following this, two more short clips – along with a higher-quality version of one of the extant scenes – were discovered in a 1966 edition of the BBC science series Tomorrow's World; these clips came to light on 11 September 2005 when the relevant section was broadcast as part of an edition of the clip-based nostalgia series Sunday Past Times on BBC Two. They were later included in the documentaries "The Dalek Tapes" (on the DVD of Genesis of the Daleks) and "Now Get out of That" (on the disc containing Terror of the Vervoids, within The Trial of a Time Lord box set).

In the UK, the black and white animation was released on DVD on 21 November 2016, and a Blu-ray/DVD bundle containing the black and white and colour versions in limited steelbook packaging was released in February 2017, making it the first 1960s Doctor Who serial to be released on Blu-ray (although not the first live-action one). A North American DVD containing the black and white and colour versions was released on 31 January 2017. They include clips from the original episodes, the CD-ROM's telesnap reconstruction, a 20-minute documentary covering the original production (Servants and Masters), and an audio commentary; additionally, a 5.1 surround mix of the serial was produced alongside a remaster of the original mono recordings.

An updated version of the animation was released on Blu-ray and DVD on 27 July 2020; it also adds newly discovered footage from the original episodes, the narrated cassette version of the serial, two new documentaries, and additional archive content, including an edition of Whicker's World ("I Don’t Like My Monsters to Have Oedipus Complexes") and surviving footage of Robin Hood starring Troughton. The new animation omits a brief 16 second segment of Episode 1, due to the complexity of the animation required and the animation team feeling they couldn't do the scene justice. The scene itself involves Troughton doing a Jig while playing his recorder, the previous attempt in 2016 was included as an Easter Egg on Disc 1.

References

External links

Photonovel of The Power of the Daleks on the BBC website
Loose Cannon reconstruction of The Power of the Daleks

Target novelisation

On Target – The Power of the Daleks

Second Doctor serials
Dalek television stories
Doctor Who missing episodes